Ethel Smith (born Ethel Goldsmith; November 22, 1902 – May 10, 1996) was an American organist who played primarily in a pop or Latin style on the Hammond organ. She had a long recording career and appeared in many films.

Early life and career
Born Ethel Goldsmith, to parents Elizabeth Bober and Max Goldsmith, she performed from a fairly young age and traveled widely, after studying both music and several languages at Carnegie Institute of Technology. She became proficient in Latin music while staying in South America, and it is the style of music with which she is now most associated.

Film and recording career
Smith performed in several Hollywood films such as George White's Scandals (1945) and Melody Time (1948). In these appearances, she was known for her colorful, elaborate costumes, especially her hats. She was married to Hollywood actor Ralph Bellamy from 1945 to 1947, at the height of her fame, and their acrimonious divorce made headlines. She never had children.

Her rendition of "Tico Tico" became her best-known hit. She performed it in the MGM film Bathing Beauty (1944), after which her recording reached the U.S. pop charts in November 1944, peaked at #14 on January 27, 1945, and sold nearly two million copies worldwide.

"Down Yonder" was her second national hit, reaching #16 on October 27, 1951.

Smith's recording of "Monkey on a String" became the theme song for Garfield Goose and Friends, a popular children's television show in Chicago that ran from 1952 until 1976.

Smith was a guitarist as well as an organist, and in her later years occasionally played the guitar live for audiences, but all her recordings were on the organ. She recorded dozens of albums, mostly for Decca Records.

Death
Smith died on May 10, 1996, at age 93.

Selected works

78s
Teddy Bear's Picnic / Fiddle-Faddle, Decca 60.298 American Series (very rare)
Tico Tico, Decca 23353
Tico Tico / Lere Lero, Decca BM03571 American Series
White Christmas / Jingle Bells, Decca BM30601 American Series
Paran Pan Pin - Cachita / The Parrot, Decca BM03632 American Series
Quizas, Quizas, Quizas / Made for Each Other, Decca 60.139 American Series
Blame It on the Samba / The Green Cockatoo, Decca 60.249 American Series
Mambo Jambo, Decca 27119
Monkey on a String, Decca 27183
I'm Walking Behind You / April in Portugal, Brunswick 05147
Ethel's Birthday Party / The Wedding of the Painted Doll, Decca 60.605
(Fifi) Bring her Out Again / Sleigh Ride, Brunswick 04517

LPs
Ethel Smith's Hit Party, Decca DL 4803
Souvenir Album, Decca DL 5016
Christmas Music, Decca DL 5034
Ethel Smith's Cha Cha Cha Album, Decca DL 8164
Christmas Music, Decca DL 8187 (expanded version of DL 5034 above)
Galloping Fingers, Decca DL 8456
Latin From Manhattan, Decca DL 8457
Miss Smith Goes to Paris, Decca DL 8640
Dance to the Latin Rhythms of Ethel Smith, Decca DL 8712
Waltz With Me, Decca DL 8735
Lady Fingers, Decca DL 8744
Bright and Breezy, Decca DL 8799
Ethel Smith Swings Sweetly, Decca DL 74095
The Many Moods of Ethel Smith, Decca DL 74145
Make Mine Hawaiian, Decca DL 74236
Lady of Spain, Decca DL 74325 
Rhythm Antics!, Decca DL 74414
At the End of a Perfect Day, Decca DL 74467
Hollywood Favorites, Decca DL 74618
Ethel Smith's Hit Party, Decca DL 74803
Seated One Day at the Organ, Decca DL 78902
Bouquet of the Blues, Decca DL 78955
Ethel Smith on Broadway, Decca DL 78993
Ethel Smith, Vocalion VL 3669
Organ Holiday, Vocalion VL 73778
Silent Night—Holy Night, Vocalion VL 73882
Parade, MCA Coral CB 20021

CDs
Tico Tico, Living Era AJA-5506 (2004). A compilation of early releases from 1944–1952
The Fabulous Organ Music of Ethel Smith, MCA MSD-35255 (out of print as of December 2005)
The First Lady of the Hammond Organ: Plays "Tico Tico" & Other Great Recordings, Jasmine Music (2003). A 2-CD compilation of early recordings

Films
Bathing Beauty (1944)
Twice Blessed (1945) as herself
George White's Scandals (1945)
Cuban Pete (1946)
Easy to Wed (1946) as herself
Melody Time: Blame It on the Samba (1948) as herself
C'mon, Let's Live a Little (1967)
The Sidelong Glances of a Pigeon Kicker (1970)
Wicked, Wicked (1973)

Music books
 The Ethel Smith Hammond Organ Method Book One, Revised Edition, Copyright 1949 and 1964 By Ethel Smith Music Corp. New York, NY. For use on every Hammond Organ including all Spinet Models.

References

External links
 The Ethel Smith Memorial Home Page
  (partially conflated with her namesakes)
 Ethel Smith recordings at the Discography of American Historical Recordings.
 "Monkey on a String"

1902 births
1996 deaths
Musicians from Pittsburgh
American organists
Women organists
People from Palm Beach, Florida
20th-century American keyboardists
20th-century organists
20th-century women musicians